The Appetite for Destruction Tour, by American hard rock band Guns N' Roses, promoted their debut album Appetite for Destruction, released in July 1987. During its 16-month duration, the band opened for bands The Cult, Mötley Crüe, Alice Cooper, Iron Maiden and Aerosmith, and headlined shows across four continents.

"We started out as a hardcore band and we toured our fucking asses off," Slash recalled. "Next thing you know, we've turned into pop stars."

It is the only tour in which the classic lineup of Axl Rose, Slash, Izzy Stradlin, Duff McKagan and Steven Adler performed together, aside from opening four shows in Los Angeles at the Los Angeles Memorial Coliseum for The Rolling Stones in October 1989.

Background
On August 20, 1988, Guns N' Roses performed at the Monsters of Rock festival at Donington Park in Castle Donington, England. At the start of their set, the capacity crowd of over 100,000 began jumping and surging forward. Despite Axl Rose's requests that the crowd move away from the stage, two fans were trampled to death. Media largely blamed the band for the tragedy, and reported that they continued playing despite the dangerous conditions. However, the venue's head of security noted that GN'R had not been aware of the extent of fan injuries, had immediately halted their set when requested to do so, and had attempted to calm the crowd.

The Texas Stadium show on September 17, 1988 is remembered by the band as one of their worst performances. "The band completely fell apart in front of this massive audience," recalled Slash. "It was desperate on stage, trying to keep everything together. I have nightmares about it."

Opening acts
Faster Pussycat
The Quireboys
Ezo
Funhouse
Junkyard
L.A. Guns
T.S.O.L.
U.D.O.
Zodiac Mindwarp and the Love Reaction
Kings of the Sun
The Angels (Angel City)
Knightshade

Setlists

Songs played overall

Typical setlist
"It's So Easy"
"Mr. Brownstone"
"Out Ta Get Me"
"Move to the City"
"You're Crazy"
"My Michelle"
"Rocket Queen"
"Sweet Child O' Mine"
"Welcome to the Jungle"
"Knockin' on Heaven's Door" (Bob Dylan cover)[Encore]
"Nightrain"
"Paradise City"

3 Nights @ "The Marquee"

June 19, 1987
"Reckless Life"
"Out Ta Get Me"
"Anything Goes"
"It's So Easy"
"Mr. Brownstone"
"Nightrain"
"My Michelle"
"You're Crazy"
"Paradise City"
"Knockin' on Heaven's Door" (Bob Dylan cover) [Encore]
"Move to the City"
"Mama Kin" (Aerosmith cover)

June 22, 1987
"Shadow of Your Love" (Hollywood Rose cover)
"Out Ta Get Me"
"Anything Goes" 
"It's So Easy"
"Mr. Brownstone"
"Nightrain"
"My Michelle" 
"Welcome to the Jungle"
"You're Crazy" 
"Paradise City" 
"Knockin' on Heaven's Door" (Bob Dylan cover) [Encore]
"Move to the City"
"Nice Boys" (Rose Tattoo cover)

June 28, 1987
"Welcome to the Jungle" 
"Out Ta Get Me"
"Rocket Queen"
"Nightrain"
"My Michelle" 
"It's So Easy"
"Mr. Brownstone"
"Don't Cry"
"You're Crazy" 
"Paradise City"
"Whole Lotta Rosie" (AC/DC cover)
"Knockin' on Heaven's Door" (Bob Dylan cover) [Encore]
"Move to the City"
"Mama Kin" (Aerosmith cover)

North America (1st leg)
"It's So Easy"
"Anything Goes"
"Out Ta Get Me"
"Mr. Brownstone"
"Nightrain"
"Welcome to the Jungle"
"My Michelle"
"Knockin' on Heaven's Door" (Bob Dylan cover)
"You're Crazy"
"Paradise City"
"Guns N' Roses Instrumental Band Jam"
"Nice Boys" (Rose Tattoo cover)

Europe
"It's So Easy"
"Move to the City"
"Anything Goes"
"Out Ta Get Me"
"Mr. Brownstone"
"My Michelle"
"Rocket Queen"
"Sweet Child O' Mine"
"Welcome to the Jungle"
"Nightrain"
"Knockin' on Heaven's Door" (Bob Dylan cover)
"You're Crazy"
"Paradise City" [Encore]
"Reckless Life"
"Mama Kin" (Aerosmith cover)
"Whole Lotta Rosie" (AC/DC over)

North America (2nd leg)

Headliner
"It's So Easy"
"Move to the City"
"Out Ta Get Me"
"Mr. Brownstone"
"My Michelle"
"Sweet Child O' Mine"
"Rocket Queen"
"Welcome to the Jungle"
"Knockin' on Heaven's Door" (Bob Dylan cover)
"You're Crazy"
"Paradise City" [Encore]
"Nightrain"
"Mama Kin" (Aerosmith cover)
"Whole Lotta Rosie" (AC/DC cover)

The Ritz
"It's So Easy" 
"Move to the City"
"Out Ta Get Me"
"Mr. Brownstone" 
"Welcome to the Jungle" 
"My Michelle" 
"Don't Cry" 
"Rocket Queen" 
"Nightrain"
"Sweet Child O' Mine"
"Knockin' on Heaven's Door" (Bob Dylan cover)
"You're Crazy" 
"Paradise City" [Encore]
"Reckless Life"
"Mama Kin" (Aerosmith cover)

CBGB's
"You're Crazy"
"One in a Million"
"Used to Love Her"
"Patience"
"Mr. Brownstone"
"Move to the City"

The Omni
"Communication Breakdown" (Led Zeppelin cover)
"Honky Tonk Women"(The Rolling Stones cover)
"Guns N' Roses Instrumental Band Jam"

Supporting "Mötley Crüe"
"It's So Easy"
"Out Ta Get Me"
"Anything Goes"
"Mr. Brownstone"
"My Michelle"
"Sweet Child O' Mine"
"Don't Cry"
"Knockin' on Heaven's Door" (Bob Dylan cover)
"Welcome to the Jungle"
"Paradise City" [Encore]
"Nightrain"
"Mama Kin"

Supporting "Alice Cooper"
"It's So Easy"
"Out Ta Get Me"
"Mr. Brownstone" 
"Sweet Child O' Mine" 
"My Michelle" 
"Knockin' on Heaven's Door" (Bob Dylan cover)
"Welcome to the Jungle"
"Nightrain"
"Paradise City"

North America (3rd leg)

Typical setlist
"It's So Easy"
"Move to the City"
"Mr. Brownstone"
"Out Ta Get Me"
"Sweet Child O' Mine"
"Used to Love Her"
"My Michelle"
"Rocket Queen"
"Welcome to the Jungle"
"Only Women Bleed" (Alice Cooper cover) [Intro] and "Knockin' on Heaven's Door" (Bob Dylan cover)
"You're Crazy"
"Guns N' Roses Instrumental Band Jam"
"Nightrain"
"Paradise City" [1st encore]
"Patience"
"Mama Kin" (Aerosmith cover) [2nd encore]
"Don't Cry"
"Nice Boys" (Rose Tattoo cover) [Final encore]
"Whole Lotta Rosie" (AC/DCcover)

The Coconut Teaszer
"I Got a Line on You" (Spirit cover)
"Wishing Well" (Free cover)
"Communication Breakdown' (Led Zeppelin cover)
"Scarred for Life" (Rose Tattoo cover)
"Sentimental Movie"
"Yesterdays"
"Knockin' on Heaven's Door" (Bob Dylan cover)
"Born to Be Wild" (Mars Bonfire cover)
"Honky Tonk Women" (The Rolling Stones cover)

The Limelight
"One in a Million"
"Patience"
"Corn Shucker" (Mentors cover)
"Knockin' on Heaven's Door" (Bob Dylan cover)
"Used to Love Her"
"Don't Cry"
"Welcome to the Jungle"
"It's So Easy" 
"Not Fade Away" (The Crickets cover)
"Mr. Brownstone" 
"Born to Be Wild" (Mars Bonfire cover)
"Rocket Queen"
"Guns N' Roses Instrumental Band Jam"
"You Shook Me" (Willie Dixon cover)
"Rock & Roll" (Led Zeppelin cover)

MTV Live @ The Ritz
"It's So Easy"
"Mr. Brownstone"
"Out Ta Get Me"
"Sweet Child O' Mine"
"My Michelle" 
"Knockin' on Heaven's Door" (Bob Dylan cover)
"Welcome to the Jungle"
"Nightrain"
"Paradise City" [Encore]
"Mama Kin" (Aerosmithcover)
"Rocket Queen"

North America (4th leg)

Headliner
"It's So Easy"
"Move to the City"
"Mr. Brownstone"
"Out Ta Get Me"
"My Michelle"
"Rocket Queen"
"Only Women Bleed" (Alice Cooper cover) [Intro] and "Knockin' on Heaven's Door" (Bob Dylan cover)
"Welcome to the Jungle"
"Sweet Child O' Mine"
Slash guitar solo
"Guns N' Roses Instrumental Band Jam"
"You're Crazy"
"Used to Love Her"
"Nightrain" [1st encore]
"Mama Kin" (Aerosmithcover)
"Patience" [2nd encore]
"Reckless Life"
"Don't Cry" [Final encore]
"Paradise City"

Supporting "Iron Maiden"
"It's So Easy"
"Mr. Brownstone"
"Out Ta Get Me"
"Sweet Child O' Mine"
"My Michelle"
"Hair of the Dog" (Nazareth cover)
"It Tastes Good, Don't It?"
"Rocket Queen"
"Only Women Bleed" (Alice Cooper cover) [Intro] and "Knockin' on Heaven's Door" (Bob Dylancover)
"Welcome to the Jungle"
"Nightrain"
Slash guitar solo
"Used to Love Her"
"Paradise City"

Irvine Meadows
"Marseilles" (The Angels cover)
"It's So Easy"

North America (Aerosmith leg)

5th Leg
"It's So Easy"
"Mr. Brownstone"
"Out Ta Get Me"
"Move to the City"
"I Was Only Joking" (Rod Stewart cover) [Intro] and "Patience"
"Rocket Queen"
Slash guitar solo
"Guns N' Roses Instrumental Band Jam"
"Paradise City"
"You're Crazy"
"Welcome to the Jungle"
"Sweet Child O' Mine"
"Used to Love Her"
"Only Women Bleed" (Alice Cooper cover) [Intro] and "Knockin' on Heaven's Door" (Bob Dylan cover)
"It Tastes Good, Don't It?" [Encore]

Final leg
"You're Crazy"
"It's So Easy"
"Mr. Brownstone"
"Out Ta Get Me"
"Move to the City"
"Rocket Queen"
"My Michelle"
"I Was Only Joking" (Rod Stewart cover) [Intro] and "Patience"
"Welcome to the Jungle"
"Nightrain"
Slash guitar solo
"Guns N' Roses Instrumental Band Jam"
"Used to Love Her"
"Only Women Bleed" (Alice Cooper cover) and Knockin' on Heaven's Door (Bob Dylan cover)
"Sweet Child O' Mine"
"Paradise City"

Monsters of Rock England
"It's So Easy" 
"Mr. Brownstone"
"You're Crazy" 
"Paradise City" 
"Guns N' Roses Instrumental Band Jam"
"Welcome to the Jungle" 
"Patience" 
"Sweet Child O' Mine"

4 Nights @ LA Coliseum
"It's So Easy"
"Mr. Brownstone"
"Out Ta Get Me"
"Move to the City"
"I Was Only Joking" (Rod Stewart cover) [Intro] and "Patience"
"My Michelle"
Slash guitar solo
"Rocket Queen"
"Sweet Child O' Mine"
"Welcome to the Jungle"
"Only Women Bleed" (Alice Cooper cover) and "Knockin' on Heaven's Door" (Bob Dylan cover)
"Paradise City" [Encore]

Farm Aid IV
"Civil War"
"Down on the Farm" (U.K. Subs cover)

Pacific leg
"You're Crazy"
"It's So Easy"
"Mr. Brownstone"
"Move to the City"
"Out Ta Get Me"
"I Was Only Joking" (Rod Stewart cover) [Intro] and "Patience"
"Rocket Queen"
"My Michelle"
Slash guitar solo
"Guns N' Roses Instrumental Band Jam"
"Used to Love Her"
"Only Women Bleed" (Alice Cooper cover) [Intro], "Mother" (Danzig cover) [Intro] and "Knockin' on Heaven's Door" (Bob Dylan cover)
"Nightrain" [1st encore]
"Welcome to the Jungle"
"Bad Time" (Grand Funk Railroad cover) [Intro] and "Sweet Child O' Mine" [2nd encore]
"Mama Kin" (Aerosmith cover)
"Paradise City" [Final encore]
"Nice Boys" (Rose Tattoo cover)

Tour dates

Personnel
Classic "Appetite for Destruction" line-up
Axl Rose – lead vocals
Slash – lead guitar
Izzy Stradlin – rhythm guitar, backing vocals
Duff McKagan – bass, backing vocals
Steven Adler – drums, backing vocals

Substitute musicians
Fred Coury – drums (December 17, 1987 – January 5, 1988)
Kid "Haggis" Chaos – bass (May 27, 1988)

References

1987 concert tours
1988 concert tours
Guns N' Roses concert tours